Myth Conceptions is a fantasy novel by American writer Robert Lynn Asprin published in 1981.

Plot summary
Myth Conceptions is a novel in which the apprentice wizard Skeeve serves a demon from Perv and they are hired as court wizards to defeat an army.

Reception
Greg Costikyan reviewed Myth Conceptions in Ares Magazine #8 and commented that "the field of humorous science fiction has too long been without a steady practitioner. Asprin fills the gap admirably, and it is to be hoped that he will continue in the same rich vein."

Reviews
Review by Tom Staicar (1982) in Amazing Science Fiction Stories, September 1982 
Review by Don D'Ammassa (1993) in Science Fiction Chronicle, #166 September 1993

References

1981 novels